Sports Jeopardy! is an American game show adapted from the quiz show Jeopardy!.  The show debuted on Crackle on September 24, 2014. Hosted by Dan Patrick, this version featured largely identical play to the parent program, but highlights sports trivia instead of general knowledge.

Format 
In fall 2014, Crackle, an online video streaming service owned by Sony, began exclusively carrying Sports Jeopardy!, a themed version of the show with material focused entirely on sports trivia. Dan Patrick was announced to host this spin-off. Kelly Miyahara, a member of the Jeopardy! Clue Crew, serves as an on-camera announcer. Howie Schwab serves as off-camera judge and consultant. Each category has only four clues (250, 500, 750, and 1,000 in the Jeopardy! round, with those values doubled for Double Jeopardy!) compared to five in the parent series, plus, like its parent counterpart, Daily Doubles (one in Round 1, two in Round 2). As mentioned, dollar amounts are replaced with point amounts. The fewer clues allows Patrick and the contestants more time to interact during the interview portion of the show and during a "postgame" segment during and after the closing credits.

In this version, contestants play for points, with the third- and second-place contestants winning $1,000 and $2,000 respectively (the same as the parent series) and the champ earning $5,000. For the first season, three new contestants competed on each episode. Returning champions were added in the second season. The top three scorers from the first season competed in a Tournament of Champions for a $50,000 top prize, which saw Justin Shibilski, a Yankees fan from Aurora, Illinois, defeat Steve Greene and Nate Marks to win the season championship. Three celebrity games were played on air, including two featuring personalities from host Dan Patrick's radio show, and one football-themed game starring NFL Network personalities.

Contestants from normal Jeopardy! games could try out for and compete on Sports Jeopardy!, with notable examples including prior Tournament of Champions competitors Cora Peck, Claudia Perry, Dan McShane, and Kate Waits. As well, season 1 championship finalist Steve Greene was a semifinalist in the regular Jeopardy!'s College Championship in November 2010. Likewise, Sports Jeopardy! contestants can compete on regular Jeopardy! episodes, such as prior two-day Sports Jeopardy! champion Ron Freshour in July 2018 and season 1 championship finalist Nate Marks in April 2019.

For season 2, which premiered on September 23, 2015, the show changed to allow each episodes winner to return for the next episode as the returning champion; however, if a game ended with all three players finishing with zero points, it would result in three new players competing the next episode. This is the same format followed by Jeopardy!, in which they could compete indefinitely unless beaten; a tie between two or three players with at least one point would result in a sudden-death answer playoff, in a pre-determined category. This was to allow the show to be seen as more easily binge-watched. Under the returning champions format, four contestants won five consecutive games, including 15-day champion Vinny Varadarajan, eight-day champion Earl Holland, six-day champion Eric Park, and five-day champion Roy Hollis, with no tournament or final announced on-air for top winning contestants as of the most recent episodes.

In April 2016, Sports Jeopardy! was acquired for television by NBCSN. Starting on August 6, 2016, the program aired nightly for the duration of the 2016 Summer Olympics after the conclusion of nightly coverage, and moved to airing on Wednesday nights for the 2016–17 television season. New episodes have not aired since December 7, 2016, on any platform, with Sony Pictures officially noting that the show was "on hiatus". Sports Jeopardy! is no longer streaming on Crackle. Four years after Sports Jeopardy! ceased production, the main series began to use the theme and think music for its 2020 college championship.

Episodes

See also 
 The Dan Patrick Show

References

External links 
 http://www.sportsjeopardy.com Official website as of 2018, saved as a cache on Wayback Machine
 Official registration website
 Sports Jeopardy! at Crackle
 

Crackle (streaming service) original programming
Television series by Sony Pictures Television
2014 American television series debuts
2016 American television series endings
2010s American game shows
American sports television series
American television spin-offs
English-language television shows
Jeopardy!